Scott Edward Walker (born 5 March 1975) is a Scottish footballer who played for several clubs in Scotland and England, including St Mirren, Dunfermline Athletic and Hartlepool United.

References

External links

1975 births
Footballers from Glasgow
Living people
Scottish footballers
Association football central defenders
Dalry Thistle F.C. players
Kilmarnock F.C. players
Kilwinning Rangers F.C. players
East Stirlingshire F.C. players
St Mirren F.C. players
Dunfermline Athletic F.C. players
Alloa Athletic F.C. players
Brechin City F.C. players
Hartlepool United F.C. players
Ayr United F.C. players
Linlithgow Rose F.C. players
Scottish Premier League players
Scottish Football League players
English Football League players
Scottish Junior Football Association players